Initiative 71 may refer to:

 2004 California Proposition 71, a California voter initiative to support stem cell research
 2014 Washington, D.C., Initiative 71, a Washington, D.C., voter initiative to legalize recreational cannabis